Oswaldo Rodolfo da Silva (7 July 1917 – 7 July 1987), known as Dino, was a Brazilian footballer. He played in four matches for the Brazil national football team in 1942. He was also part of Brazil's squad for the 1942 South American Championship.

References

External links
 
 

1917 births
1987 deaths
Brazilian footballers
Brazil international footballers
Footballers from São Paulo
Association football midfielders
Associação Atlética Portuguesa (Santos) players
Sport Club Corinthians Paulista players
CR Vasco da Gama players
America Football Club (Rio de Janeiro) players
Jabaquara Atlético Clube players